Kirk Dewayne Franklin (born January 26, 1970) is an American songwriter, choir director, gospel singer, and rapper. He is best known for leading urban contemporary gospel ensembles such as The Family, God's Property, and One Nation Crew (1NC) among many others. He has won numerous awards, including 19 Grammy Awards. Variety dubbed Franklin as a "Reigning King of Urban Gospel", and is one of the inaugural inductees into the Black Music & Entertainment Walk of Fame.

Early life 
A native of Fort Worth, Texas, Franklin was raised by his aunt, Gertrude, having been abandoned as a baby by his mother. Gertrude recycled aluminum cans to raise money for Kirk to take piano lessons from the age of four. Kirk excelled and was able to read and write music while also playing by ear.

At the age of seven, Franklin received his first contract which his aunt turned down.  He did join the church choir and became music director of the Mt. Rose Baptist Church adult choir at 11 years of age.

In his teenage years, Franklin rebelled against his strict religious upbringing, and in an attempt to keep him out of trouble, his grandmother arranged an audition for him at a professional youth conservatory associated with a local university. He was accepted, but later he had to deal with a girlfriend's pregnancy and his eventual expulsion from school for bad behavior.

Franklin studied music with Jewell Kelly and the Singing Chaparrals at Oscar Dean Wyatt High School. He continued under her tutelage and ultimately became the pianist for the choir.

When he was aged 15 he witnessed the death of a friend by shooting, after which Franklin returned to the church, where he again directed the choir. He also co-founded a gospel group, The Humble Hearts, which recorded one of Franklin's compositions and got the attention of gospel music legend Milton Biggham, musical director of the Georgia Mass Choir. Impressed, Biggham enlisted him to lead the DFW Mass Choir in a recording of Franklin's song "Every Day with Jesus". This led to Biggham hiring Franklin, just 20 years old at the time, to lead the choir at the 1990 Gospel Music Workshop of America Convention, an industry gathering.

Career

With groups (1992–2000) 
In 1992, Franklin organized "The Family", which was a 17-voice choir, formed from neighborhood friends and associates. In 1992, Vicki Mack-Lataillade, the co-founder of fledgling GospoCentric Records label, heard one of their demo tapes and was so impressed she immediately signed up Kirk & The Family to a recording contract.

In 1993, the group, now known as "Kirk Franklin & The Family", released their debut album, Kirk Franklin & The Family. It spent almost two years on the gospel music charts and charted on the R&B charts, eventually earning platinum sales status. It remained at No. 1 on the Billboard Top Gospel Albums chart for 42 weeks. It was only the third gospel music album to sell over a million units after Aretha Franklin's Amazing Grace and BeBe & CeCe Winans' Addictive Love.

Two years later, after releasing a 1995 Christmas album entitled Kirk Franklin & the Family Christmas, the group released Whatcha Lookin' 4 in 1996. The album was certified 2× platinum and earned Franklin his first Grammy Award for Best Contemporary Soul Gospel Album. 1997 brought another album, a collaboration with the vocal ensemble God's Property, aptly named God's Property from Kirk Franklin's Nu Nation. The lead single, "Stomp", featuring Cheryl "Salt" James (of Salt-N-Pepa), was a big hit, enjoying heavy rotation on MTV and other music channels and charting at No. 1 on the R&B Singles Airplay chart for two weeks, even making it into the Top 40. God's Property from Kirk Franklin's Nu Nation was No. 1 on the R&B Albums chart for five weeks, No. 3 on the Pop charts, and would go on to be certified 3× platinum. It also brought Franklin another Grammy for Best Contemporary Soul Gospel Album, as well as three Grammy nominations.

In 1996, Franklin's song "Joy" was recorded by Whitney Houston and the Georgia Mass Choir. With production by Houston and Mervyn Warren, the composition was included on the best-selling gospel album of all time, soundtrack to The Preacher's Wife.

On November 2, 1998, God's Property sued Franklin. The lawsuit, filed in Los Angeles Superior Court, alleges that Franklin induced God's Property founder Linda Searight into signing an "onerous and one-sided" contract with B-Rite Music.

The Nu Nation Project was released in 1998. The first single, "Lean on Me", produced by Franklin and pop producer Dan Shea, featured several mainstream artists, including R. Kelly, Mary J. Blige and Bono of U2 together with Crystal Lewis and The Family. "Lean on Me" and the second single "Revolution" (featuring Rodney Jerkins) were considerable hits, and the album contained a version of a Bill Withers song "Gonna Be a Lovely Day". The Nu Nation Project went on to top the Billboard Contemporary Christian Albums chart for 23 weeks and the Billboard Gospel Albums chart for 49 weeks, and brought Franklin his third Grammy.

Also in 1998, Franklin had made a guest appearance on the hit television sitcom Sister, Sister.

In 2000, members of The Family filed a multimillion-dollar lawsuit for royalties for their work on The Nu Nation Project against Franklin and GospoCentric Records. This saw the end of the "Kirk Franklin & The Family" records, as Franklin continued with his newer group One Nation Crew, releasing Kirk Franklin Presents 1NC. The album was recorded prior to the lawsuit.

On January 16, 2010, at the 25th Annual Stellar Awards show taping in Nashville, Tennessee, Kirk Franklin & The Family reunited briefly on stage to perform songs made popular by them in the 1990s.

Solo artist (2001–present) 
In 2001, he produced the soundtrack for the film Kingdom Come. The soundtrack included gospel artists Mary Mary, Trin-i-tee 5:7, Crystal Lewis, and Franklin's group 1NC, as well as mainstream artists Az Yet, Jill Scott, Tamar Braxton, Shawn Stockman of Boyz II Men and others.

The Rebirth of Kirk Franklin was released in February 2002 after being delayed. It topped the Gospel Albums chart for 29 weeks, was No. 1 on the Hot R&B/Hip-Hop Albums chart, and was certified Platinum. The album featured collaborations with Bishop T.D. Jakes, Shirley Caesar, Willie Neal Johnson, TobyMac, Crystal Lewis, Jaci Velasquez, Papa San, Alvin Slaughter, and Yolanda Adams.

On October 4, 2005, Hero was released in the United States. It reached No. 1 on both the Billboard Top Christian and Top Gospel albums. The first single, "Looking for You", was a hit, as was the follow-up "Imagine Me", which made it onto the R&B charts. At the 2007 Grammy Awards, Franklin won two Grammys for Hero. Additionally, Hero was the 2007 Stellar Awards CD of the Year.

The album debuted on the Billboard 200 at No. 33 with 74,000 copies sold in the first week. It reached No. 1 on both the Billboard Top Gospel and Top Christian albums charts, and also peaked at No. 7 on the Billboard Top R&B/Hip-Hop Albums Chart. The album features guest appearances from Rance Allen, Isaac Carree, TobyMac, Da' T.R.U.T.H., Doug Williams (singer) and Melvin Williams (singer). 
The song "Jesus" was released as the album's second single in 2008 and was sent to Urban AC radio on July 15, 2008. In January 2010, after Haiti had a devastating earthquake, Franklin got an ensemble of gospel artists together to sing the song he wrote, called "Are You Listening". They included Yolanda Adams, Jeremy Camp, Shirley Caesar, Dorinda Clark-Cole, Natalie Grant, Fred Hammond, Tamela Mann, David Mann, Mary Mary, Donnie McClurkin, Bishop Paul S. Morton, J. Moss, Smokie Norful, Marvin Sapp, Karen Clark-Sheard, Kierra Sheard, BeBe Winans, CeCe Winans, and Marvin Winans.

In 2005, Franklin appeared with his wife on The Oprah Winfrey Show to discuss how he ended his pornography addiction. In 2010, he published The Blueprint: A Plan for Living Above Life's Storms, a book in which he recounts the family difficulties experienced during his childhood, and how he got out of a sexually active life and an addiction to pornography.

Franklin served as the host and co-executive producer of the BET original series Sunday Best and the musical co-host of GSN's The American Bible Challenge with Jeff Foxworthy. Franklin's 11th studio album called Hello Fear was released on March 22, 2011. The album features Marvin Sapp, Mali Music, Marvin Winans, John P. Kee, and Rance Allen. The first single, "I Smile", peaked at No. 85 on the Billboard Hot 100, making it his first appearance on that chart in six years.

In 2013, Franklin being signing artists onto his label, Fo Yo Soul Recordings, which became an imprint with RCA Records, and he has signed acts such as The Walls Group and artists like Tasha Page-Lockhart. These two artists received ten Stellar Award nominations at the 30th Stellar Awards. The Walls Group won seven awards, while Page-Lockhart won three of her own, and Franklin won two more for his label.

In September 2015, Franklin announced his 12th studio album, Losing My Religion, and the album was released on November 13, 2015. The first single off the album, "Wanna Be Happy?", was released on August 28, 2015.
It was at this point that Vinson Cunningham referred to him as a hype man when writing for the New Yorker.

Franklin contributed to Tori Kelly's Hiding Place album, released September 14, 2018. They had intended to collaborate on one song, but it turned into a larger project.

On January 25, 2019, Franklin released his single "Love Theory" and official music video for the song. "Love Theory" served the first single from his 13th studio album, Long Live Love. Franklin released his second single, "Just for Me", in April 2019. His third single, "OK", was released in May 2019. Long Live Love was released on May 31.

In February 2019, it was announced that BET's gospel music reality singing competition, Sunday Best would return from a four-year hiatus. Franklin will reprise his role as host.

After Trinity Broadcasting Network aired the 2019 GMA Dove Awards on October 20, 2019, Franklin commented that his acceptance speech was edited to remove comments he made in relation to the killing of Atatiana Jefferson by a police officer. He stated that he was boycotting the award show going forward as it was not the first time they had edited his acceptance speech to remove "reflections on police violence against Black Americans". GMA president, Jackie Patillo, apologized to Franklin and GMA made an unedited version of the speech available but stated that it was an unintentional action and that they were attempting to reduce the running time to meet a two-hour time-slot. Several other artists supported Franklin's boycott.

In 2021, he was among the inaugural inductees into the Black Music & Entertainment Walk of Fame.

On May 21, 2021, Franklin and American rapper Lil Baby released the song "We Win" for the soundtrack to the 2021 film Space Jam: A New Legacy.

Personal life 

On January 20, 1996, Franklin married long-time friend Tammy Collins. When they wed, they each had one child from previous relationships. As a couple, they have two children together. 

In March 2021, Franklin's oldest son, Kerrion, released an audio recording of a private conversation between him and his father in which both can be heard using profanities. Franklin subsequently apologized to his fans and followers.

Discography

Kirk Franklin & The Family 
Kirk Franklin & The Family (1993)
Kirk Franklin & the Family Christmas (1995) 
Whatcha Lookin' 4 (1996)

Kirk Franklin's Nu Nation 
God's Property from Kirk Franklin's Nu Nation (1997) 
The Nu Nation Project (1998)

Kirk Franklin and 1 Nation Crew 
Kirk Franklin Presents 1NC (2000)

Kirk Franklin
The Rebirth of Kirk Franklin (2002) 
Hero (2005) 
The Fight of My Life (2007) 
Hello Fear (2011) 
Losing My Religion (2015) 
Long, Live, Love (2019)

Kirk Franklin & Maverick City Music
Kingdom Book One (2022)

Awards 

Franklin has received many awards, including Grammy Awards, GMA Dove Awards, BET Awards, Soul Train Music Awards and Stellar Awards.

He received 19 Grammys  and 22 Dove Awards.

References

Further reading

External links 
 
 
 
 
 Fo Yo Soul Recordings profile
 Kirk Franklin 2016 Radio Interview at Soulinterviews.com

1970 births
Living people
20th-century African-American musicians
20th-century evangelicals
21st-century African-American musicians
21st-century evangelicals
African-American Christians
American evangelicals
American performers of Christian hip hop music
GospoCentric artists
Grammy Award winners
Interscope Records artists
Musicians from Texas
People from Fort Worth, Texas
Performers of Christian contemporary R&B music